Tøraasen is a Norwegian surname. Notable people with the surname include:

Finn Tøraasen (1936–2018), Norwegian footballer
Knut Tøraasen (1938–2013), Norwegian civil servant and diplomat

Norwegian-language surnames